Bluestockings is a radical bookstore, café, and activist center located in the Lower East Side of Manhattan, New York City. It started as a volunteer-supported and collectively owned bookstore; and is currently a worker-owned bookstore with mutual aid offerings/free store. The store started in 1999 as a feminist bookstore and was named for a group of Enlightenment intellectual women, the Bluestockings. Its founding location was 172 Allen Street, and is currently located a few blocks east on 116 Suffolk Street.

Influences
Bluestockings actively supports "movements that challenge hierarchy and all systems of oppression" and is one of 13 identified feminist bookstores in the United States and Canada. Ideologically, Bluestockings has been influenced by intersectional feminism, anti-capitalism, and the anti-globalization movement of the early 2000s, and conceptually, by other collectively run spaces and infoshops like Time's Up! Its collective members see Bluestockings as an experiment in self-managed autonomous space that challenges the neoliberalist economic organization of New York City, creating a community for queer or femme activists. Inspired by feminist consciousness-raising reading groups, Bluestockings provides information on social oppression through its books, zines, and events.

Structure 
Bluestockings is a collectively owned independent bookstore that contains a small fair trade café serving coffee from Zapatista coffee cooperatives. The Bluestockings collective is a small group of worker-owners. They make decisions based on consensus, with the input and support of volunteers and community members. As of 2017, the store is registered as an S corporation in which no one person can own a majority of shares. Volunteers contribute through self-directed projects and working groups. At its peak, Bluestockings had over 70 active volunteers.

Bluestockings serves as a community meeting space for literary, activist, feminist, and intellectual gatherings. In this public space, guests can relax and socialize as long as they want without purchasing anything. Most nights, Bluestockings hosts author readings, discussions, screenings, workshops, open mics, and panels, all of which are free to attend. Some notable speakers include members of the band Pussy Riot, poet Eileen Myles, Transgender Vanguard, and the Icarus Project.

History 
Bluestockings opened in 1999 as a feminist bookstore. Founder Kathryn Welsh cited a lack of women's bookstores in New York among her reasons for founding Bluestockings. She started the store with the help of an anonymous investment of $50,000, and at the start, only women could be members of the collective. At the end of 2002, Bluestockings' revenue was negatively affected by the desertion of New York City's downtown following the September 11 attacks. This caused the store to incur debt, and its informal collective broke up.

Welsh put the bookstore up for sale in February 2003, which she described as a personal, not business, decision. Brooke Lehman, a former member of Direct Action Network, and Hitomi Matarese, an artist, bought the store from Welsh, and formed a new collective. Bluestockings reopened in May 2003 with a new model as a worker-owned bookstore and activist center. Its intersectional, leftist mission included male and transgender collective members. The founding collective members expanded Bluestockings' titles and event programming to include more social justice topics, including more books on race, class, queer politics, and the environment, in addition to fiction and poetry. Bluestockings expanded into an adjacent storefront in 2005 and began running more social programs like its "Foodstockings" cropsharing initiative.

The store was particularly successful following a 2015 Indiegogo crowdfunding campaign, held to make repairs and replace the store's awning, all of which had been delayed due to high rent in the store's gentrifying neighborhood. They also received increased support after the 2016 United States elections.

The collective hoped to remain in the Lower East Side to oppose the effects of gentrification and keep the store open as a queer safer space. In 2020, due to the coronavirus pandemic, Bluestockings was forced to move from its original location at 172 Allen Street. After extensive fundraising, the bookstore announced that it would remain in the Lower East Side and moved to 116 Suffolk Street. As of April 2021, the bookstore is now run as a worker coop.

See also
 ABC No Rio
 Firestorm Cafe & Books
 Lucy Parsons Center
 LGBT culture in New York City
 List of anarchist communities

References

Further reading

External links
 

Coffeehouses and cafés in the United States
Feminism in New York City
Infoshops
Organizations established in 1999
Feminist bookstores
Bookstores in Manhattan
Independent bookstores of the United States
History of women in New York City
Feminist organizations in the United States
1999 establishments in New York City